In the Latter Day Saint movement, the great and abominable church (also called the great whore of all the earth) is a church described in the Book of Mormon and other revelations by Joseph Smith. The great and abominable church is identified as being synonymous with the Whore of Babylon described in chapter 17 of the Book of Revelation. Although many Latter Day Saints have associated the great and abominable church with the Catholic Church, official publications of the Church of Jesus Christ of Latter-day Saints (LDS Church) have discouraged this interpretation.

Usage in the Book of Mormon
The canonical Doctrine and Covenants refers to the great and abominable church as both "the church of the devil" and the "whore of Babylon".

The major characteristics of the great and abominable church described in the Book of Mormon's First Book of Nephi are:
 It persecutes, tortures, and slays the saints of God (see 1 Ne. 13:5);
 It seeks wealth and luxury (see 1 Ne. 13:7–8);
 It is characterized by sexual immorality (see 1 Ne. 13:7);
 It has excised plain and precious things from the scriptures (see 1 Ne. 13:26–29); 
 It has dominion over all the earth, among all nations, kindreds, tongues, and people (see 1 Ne. 14:11); and
 Its fate is to be consumed by a world war, when the nations that it incites against the Saints wage war among themselves until the great and abominable church itself is destroyed (see 1 Ne. 22:13–14).

The great and abominable church is often equated with Babylon. Five of the six characteristics identified in 1 Nephi are also attributed to Babylon in the Book of Revelation:
 Babylon is drunk with the blood of the saints, the martyrs of Jesus, and the prophets (see Rev. 17:6; Rev. 18:24);
 She is known for her enjoyment of great wealth and luxury (see Rev. 17:4; Rev. 18:3, 11–16);
 She is characterized by wanton sexual immorality (see Rev. 17:1–2, 5);
 She has dominion over all nations (see Rev. 17:15, 18; Rev. 18:3, 23–24); and
 Her fate is to be consumed by the very kings who, because of her deceptions, have made war on the Lamb (see Rev. 17:14–16; Rev. 18:23).

Analysis

Interpretation of the term as referring to the Catholic Church 
The "great and abominable church" was commonly identified by early Mormons as the Catholic Church.

Historian Neil J. Young supports interpreting the term as referring to Catholic Church and writes:

The Mormon Doctrine controversy 
The first edition of LDS Church general authority Bruce R. McConkie's Mormon Doctrine stated: "It is also to the Book of Mormon to which we turn for the plainest description of the Catholic Church as the great and abominable church." As McConkie's book became popular, the belief that the great and abominable church was the Catholic Church "became embedded in popular [Mormon] belief, despite the fact that this idea was never sanctioned or preached over the pulpit."

McConkie's book became controversial with the leadership of the LDS Church, and he was pressed into making significant changes in the second edition. The second edition of Mormon Doctrine removed the reference to the Catholic Church, and instead stated: "The titles church of the devil and great and abominable church are used to identify all churches or organizations of whatever name or nature—whether political, philosophical, educational, economic social, fraternal, civic, or religious—which are designed to take men on a course that leads away from God and his laws and thus from salvation in the kingdom of God."

Other interpretations 
Official LDS publications discourage the identification of the great and abominable church with the Catholic Church, as well as with any other specific religion, denomination or organization. 

According to a 1988 article by Stephen E. Robinson in Ensign, an official magazine of LDS Church, "no single known historical church, denomination, or set of believers meets all the requirements for the great and abominable church. ... Rather, the role of Babylon has been played by many different agencies, ideologies, and churches in many different times." Regarding the popular identification of the Catholic Church with the great and abominable church, Robinson states:

More often, some have suggested that the Roman Catholic church might be the great and abominable church of Nephi 13. This is also untenable, primarily because Roman Catholicism as we know it did not yet exist when the crimes described by Nephi were being committed. In fact, the term Roman Catholic only makes sense after A.D. 1054 when it is used to distinguish the Western, Latin-speaking Orthodox church that followed the bishop of Rome from the Eastern, Greek-speaking Orthodox church that followed the bishop of Constantinople. ... Even if we use the term Catholic for the church Constantine made the state religion in A.D. 313, the New Testament as we know it was already widely circulating. That is, the plain and precious parts had already been removed. The notion of shifty-eyed medieval monks rewriting the scriptures is unfair and bigoted. We owe those monks a debt of gratitude that anything was saved at all.

More generally, Robinson notes: "Some Latter-day Saints have erred in believing that some specific denomination, to the exclusion of all others, has since the beginning of time been the great and abominable church. This is dangerous, for many will then want to know which it is, and an antagonistic relationship with that denomination will inevitably follow."

In a 2003 book published by the Religious Studies Center, Robinson elaborated:

In a similar vein, the semi-official Encyclopedia of Mormonism states: "Though many Protestants, following the lead of Martin Luther, have linked this evil force described in Revelation 17 with the Roman Catholic church, the particular focus of these LDS and New Testament scriptures seems rather to be on earlier agents of apostasy in the Jewish and Christian traditions".

See also
 Mormon folklore

References

Book of Mormon words and phrases
Latter Day Saint belief and doctrine
Mormonism-related controversies
Whore of Babylon
Anti-Catholic slurs